Sharvineh (also Romanized as Sharvīneh and Shervīneh; also known as Shervenīneh) is a village in Sharvineh Rural District, Kalashi District, Javanrud County, Kermanshah Province, Iran. At the 2006 census, its population was 648, in 144 families.

References 

Populated places in Javanrud County